The 2014 Dayton Sharks season was the second season for the Continental Indoor Football League (CIFL) franchise.

In June 2013, the Sharks agreed to terms with the CIFL to return for the 2014 season.

Roster

Schedule

Regular season

Standings

Coaching staff

References

2014 Continental Indoor Football League season
Dayton Sharks
Dayton Sharks